Marcia Helen Morey (born August 14, 1955) is an American politician, former judge and former competition swimmer who represented the United States at the 1976 Summer Olympics in Montreal.  She competed in the preliminary heats of the women's 100-meter breaststroke and 200-meter breaststroke events, recording times of 1:17.30 and 2:41.85, respectively. Morey has represented the 30th district in the North Carolina House of Representatives since her initial appointment in 2017. She has been re-elected to the seat twice, most recently in 2020.

A graduate of Millikin University, she served as the Chief District Court Judge of the 14th Judicial District in North Carolina. before being appointed to the North Carolina House of Representatives in April 2017 by Governor Roy Cooper to fill a vacancy.

Prior to joining the legislature, she served the 14th Judicial District Court as a district court judge for 18 years and as Chief District Court Judge for 5 years.  Morey worked with law enforcement, defense attorneys, and prosecutors to develop new ways to deal with 16 and 17 year-olds who had been charged with a crime. She spearheaded a program, called the "Misdemeanor Diversion Program (MDP)," that diverts these youths to education and community service programs that allows the teens to avoid a criminal record which enables them to find jobs and receive financial aid for college. MDP has helped over 300 youth and is now a model that has been copied across North Carolina.

In 1998, Governor Jim Hunt appointed Morey as the executive director of the Governor’s Commission on Juvenile Crime and Justice to reform North Carolina's juvenile justice system.  During her tenure juvenile crime rates were reduced by approximately 40%.  She previously served as an assistant district attorney in Durham and created the first diversionary program in the state (and second in the nation) for first-time youthful offenders charged with misdemeanors in district court in 1994, The Durham County Teen Court & Restitution Program..

Morey earned her undergraduate degree from Millikin University in Illinois, her master's degree in education from Reed College, and her J.D. from Northwestern University Law School.

Morey grew up in Decatur, Illinois.  Both parents were active in their community and taught her the importance of giving back. Her father was a World War II and Korean War veteran, attorney, and city councilman. At the age of six years old, Morey became a competitive swimmer.  She went on to win 7 national titles, competed in two world championship meets, and was co-captain of the U.S. Olympic Team at the 1976 Montreal games.

Morey is a lesbian. She is one of four openly LGBT members of the North Carolina General Assembly, alongside Reps. Deb Butler (D–Wilmington), Cecil Brockman (D–High Point), and Allison Dahle (D-Raleigh).

Committee assignments

2021-2022 session
Appropriations
Appropriations - Justice and Public Safety
Education - Universities
Families, Children, and Aging Policy
Judiciary II
Transportation

2019-2020 session
Appropriations
Appropriations - Capital
Education - Universities
Judiciary
Transportation

Electoral history

2020

2018

References

External links
Campaign website
Legislative homepage

See also
 List of World Aquatics Championships medalists in swimming (women)

1955 births
Living people
People from Decatur, Illinois
People from Durham, North Carolina
Politicians from Durham, North Carolina
Millikin University alumni
Reed College alumni
Northwestern University Pritzker School of Law alumni
American female breaststroke swimmers
Millikin Big Blue women's swimmers
Olympic swimmers of the United States
Sportspeople from Decatur, Illinois
Swimmers at the 1975 Pan American Games
Swimmers at the 1976 Summer Olympics
World Aquatics Championships medalists in swimming
Pan American Games gold medalists for the United States
Pan American Games silver medalists for the United States
Pan American Games bronze medalists for the United States
Pan American Games medalists in swimming
North Carolina lawyers
21st-century American politicians
LGBT state legislators in North Carolina
Lesbian politicians
Democratic Party members of the North Carolina House of Representatives
North Carolina state court judges
Lesbian sportswomen
LGBT swimmers
American athlete-politicians
American LGBT sportspeople
Medalists at the 1975 Pan American Games